List of Olympic medalists families is a list of people grouped by family who are olympic medalists.

Summer Olympics

Winter Olympics

Summer and Winter Olympics

See also
 List of sport awards
 List of multiple Olympic gold medalists
 List of multiple Olympic gold medalists at a single Games
 List of multiple Olympic gold medalists in one event
 List of multiple Olympic medalists
 List of multiple Olympic medalists at a single Games
 List of multiple Olympic medalists in one event
 List of Olympians who won medals in the Summer and Winter Games
 List of athletes with the most appearances at Olympic Games
 Lists of Paralympic medalists
 List of Olympic medalists in art competitions

References

External links

Families
Families, medalist
Olympic medalist